The Großes Festspielhaus (Large Festival House), in its current form, was designed by architect Clemens Holzmeister in 1956 for the Salzburg Festival in 
Austria. It was inaugurated on 26 July 1960 with a performance of Richard Strauss' Der Rosenkavalier conducted by Herbert von Karajan, who also worked with Holzmeister on aspects of the building's design. The Large Festival House includes office space and tunneling into the Mönchsberg as well as a 2,179-seat performance space adaptable for both scenic and non-scenic events and acoustically scalable down for piano and song recitals. The auditorium is square. Access from the street to the lobby is through five bronze doors, above which is inscribed a Latin motto by Thomas Michels: SACRA CAMENAE DOMUS / CONCITIS CARMINE PATET / QUO NOS ATTONITOS / NUMEN AD AURAS FERAT (The Muse's holy house is open to those moved by song / divine power bears us up who are inspired).

See also
List of opera houses
List of opera festivals

External links
Salzburg Festival official website (in English)

Opera houses in Austria
Buildings and structures in Salzburg
Music venues completed in 1960
Theatres completed in 1960
Festspielhaus, Großes
Clemens Holzmeister buildings and structures
Theatres in Salzburg